An hourglass corset is a garment that produces a silhouette resembling an hourglass shape characterized by wide hips, narrow waist (wasp waist), and wide bust.

History

Hourglass corsets first became fashionable in the 1830s in Europe and the US. In contrast to Empire or late Georgian waistlines in which the "waist" lies just below the bust, Victorian fashion accentuated natural waistlines but further constricted them.   

The hourglass corset achieved immediate waist reduction, as it acted mainly on a short zone around the waist. Rather than attempting to slim the torso around the ribs, tissue could be compressed and redistributed above and below the waistline. 

The hourglass became the iconic corset shape. They are featured in the media; often the image of the corset shown is of a "woman clutching a bedpost while their maid pulls and pulls at the corset strings". The hourglass corset accentuated slim waists and broadened the bust, shoulders and hips. These elements worked in tandem with very wide skirts, large sleeves, and sloping shoulders to create the wide-slim-wide hourglass figure.

Hourglass silhouettes remained popular throughout the 19th century, though outerwear styles evolved. In England, France, and America these corsets were mainly worn by aristocrats and in some cases royalty.

As skirts and sleeves shrank, Edwardian era fashions began to favor a more slender, vertical look. Princess line dresses were popular in the 1880s. These were made without a horizontal waist seam and with long vertical seams running the length of the dress, with the dress closely fitted to the body. Hourglass corsets evolved to emphasize the vertical lines of the body, and attempted to slim the torso above the waist as well.

Variations
Initially hourglass corsets were not laced as tightly as the straight-fronted corsets fashionable at the beginning of the twentieth century.  Corsets were still the norm, but they no longer had the exaggerated wide-narrow-wide silhouette of the hourglass shape.

Straight-fronted corsets are one of the most common styles of corset made today, and may be used for post-pregnancy waist training.

Pipe-stem waist 

A pipe-stem waist is a silhouette given by wearing a certain kind of corset. The corset is designed so that the circumference of the waist is compressed for a distance above the natural waistline.  These were never common, as the added pressure on the rib cage as ribs are pressed inwards can be uncomfortable.

Reports of nineteenth century pipe-stem waists on corsets often cite a height of up to 15 cm (6 inches). 

Devotees of this silhouette trained their figures for many years and only a few public examples exist. Usually this figure is adopted for erotic purposes or as part of the body modification movement.

Criticisms

Corsets were criticized as detrimental to the wearer's health. While they have been praised as a device for improving posture, many health care professionals advise against the use of constrictive garments for extended periods.

The shape of the rib cage could be altered by tightly laced corsets. Also, tightly laced corsets can irritate skin, reduce lung capacity, and weaken muscles that support the back and the chest. Some of the long-term effects that are thought to be caused by tight-corset wearing include reduced pelvis size, constipation and digestive issues, and reproductive problems.

See also

 History of corsets
 Tightlacing
 Corset controversy

References

External links
The Corset: Questions of Pressure and Displacement. 1887
 what a modern pipe-stem waist looks like.

1830s fashion
1880s fashion
19th-century fashion
History of clothing (Western fashion)
Victorian fashion
Corsetry